Edwin J. Fehrenbach (March 19, 1919 – August 15, 1992) was an American politician who served in the New York State Assembly from Nassau's 4th district from 1957 to 1965.

References

1919 births
1992 deaths
Republican Party members of the New York State Assembly
20th-century American politicians